Sidney M. Wolfe is an American physician and  the co-founder and director of Public Citizen's Health Research Group, a consumer and health advocacy lobbying organization. He has publicly crusaded against many pharmaceutical drugs, which he and his organization believe to be a danger to public health.

Biography
After earning his medical degree at Case Western Reserve University, Cleveland, Ohio, Wolfe completed an internship and residency in internal medicine. Beginning in 1966 he researched blood-clotting and alcoholism at the National Institutes of Health. He met consumer advocate Ralph Nader in Washington, D.C. at a meeting of the American Patients Association, and advised Nader on health problems in the United States. Wolfe co-founded the consumer lobbying organization Health Research Group with Nader in 1971 and has been its Director ever since. Since 1995 he has been an Adjunct Professor of Internal Medicine at the Case Western Reserve University School of Medicine.

For more than 30 years, Wolfe campaigned to have propoxyphene (Darvon, Darvocet) removed from the American market, because it can cause heart arrhythmias.  In 2009, a U.S. Food and Drug Administration (FDA) advisory panel recommended that it be withdrawn from the market. The recommendation to ban the drug was ultimately not upheld and instead manufacturers were required to place additional warning labels on packaging.  In 2009, Wolfe was appointed to the FDA's Drug Safety and Risk Management Committee. On November 19, 2010, the FDA recommended against continued prescribing and use of propoxyphene.
 
Other drugs that Wolfe has campaigned against include Yaz, Yasmin, Phenacetin, Oraflex, Zomax, Vioxx, Baycol and many others.

Wolfe has been interviewed on television by Phil Donahue, Barbara Walters, Bill Moyers, and Oprah Winfrey. He writes for the Huffington Post.

Wolfe is currently a member of the Society for General Internal Medicine.

Awards
MacArthur Fellows Program (1990)

Works

Books
Off Diabetes Pills: A Diabetic's Guide to Longer Life (1978) with Rebecca Warner; Health Research Group
Pills That Don't Work: A Consumers' and Doctors' Guide to Over 600 Prescription Drugs That Lack Evidence of Effectiveness; Farrar, Straus & Giroux; Revised edition (1981), with Christopher M. Coley & the Health Research Group
Worst Pills, Best Pills: A Consumer's Guide to Avoiding Drug-Induced Death or Illness (1990), with Larry D. Sasich and Peter Lurie; Gallery Books 
Worst Pills Best Pills II: The Older Adult's Guide to Avoiding Drug-Induced Death or Illness: 119 Pills You Should Not Use: 245 Safer Alternatives (1993), with Rose-Ellen Hope, Paul D. Stolley & the Health Research Group  
Worst Pills, Best Pills (1999 edition)
Worst Pills, Best Pills (2005), Simon & Schuster, 

Unnecessary Cesarean Sections: Curing a National Epidemic State Report for Illinois, with Mary Gabay & the Public Citizen Group (1994)
Questionable Doctors; Disciplined by States or the Federal Government; Public Citizen Health Research Group; 1996 edition 
2,815 Questionable Doctors; Disciplined by State and Federal Governments, Region 4: California, Hawaii, with Phyllis McCarthy, John Paul Fawcett, and Benita Marcus Adler; Public Citizen's Health Research Group; 2002 edition

Articles, book chapters
"Unethical Trials of Interventions to Reduce Perinatal Transmission of the Human Immunodeficiency Virus in Developing Countries", In: Bioethics: An Anthology (2006), Editors: Helga Kuhse, Peter Singer, Wiley-Blackwell,

Films
Certain Adverse Events (2012), documentary film (Wolfe as interviewee)

References

External links
 Public Citizen website
 Worst Pills Best Pills
 
"Health Talk: Doctors Online", Washington Post, Abigail Trafford, July 6, 1999

Year of birth missing (living people)
Living people
American health activists
Physicians from Ohio
People from Shaker Heights, Ohio
Public Citizen
Activists from Ohio
MacArthur Fellows